Qixia (栖霞) may refer to the following locations in China:

Qixia, Shandong (栖霞市), county-level city of Yantai, Shandong
Qixia District (栖霞区), Nanjing
Qixia Temple (栖霞寺), Buddhist temple in Nanjing
Qixia Mountain (栖霞山), a tourist attraction in Nanjing